Patrick Wilkinson (born May 19, 1999) is an American professional soccer player who plays for the Saint Louis Billikens.

Career
Wilkinson signed with United Soccer League side Swope Park Rangers on August 18, 2016. He made his debut on August 22, 2016, as a 68th-minute substitute in a 1-1 draw against Saint Louis FC.

References

1999 births
Living people
American soccer players
Sporting Kansas City II players
Saint Louis Billikens men's soccer players
Association football defenders
Soccer players from Kansas
Sportspeople from Overland Park, Kansas
USL Championship players
USL League Two players